At least three ships of the Imperial Russian Navy had been named Imperatritsa Maria, after either the first Maria Feodorovna or second Maria Feodorovna:

 , an 84-gun ship of the line launched in 1827
 , an 84-gun ship of the line launched in 1853
 , a dreadnought battleship launched in 1913

Russian Navy ship names